Vidya Iyer (born September 26, 1990), better known by her stage name Vidya Vox, is an American YouTuber and singer. She was born in Chennai, Tamil Nadu, India and immigrated with her family to the United States of America at the age of eight. According to NBC News, her music is a mix of "Western pop, electronic dance music, Bollywood hits, and Indian classical music." Since beginning her channel in April 2015, her videos have received over 906 million views, and her channel has accumulated over 7 million subscribers.

Personal life
Vidya Iyer was born in Chennai, Tamil Nadu, India and was raised in Virginia in the United States. Her family is from Palakkad, Kerala, and her mother and grandmother grew up in Kerala.

She is a Tamil Brahmin and speaks Tamil at home, learned Carnatic music from the age of 5, and also enjoyed listening to English music. She confessed to having an identity crisis, being bullied for being Indian, and hiding her culture while growing up, but has stated she "now feels proud" of her culture.

She was inspired by her grandmother to pursue Indian classical music. She became confident of her Indian roots in college, joined the Indian Student Association, and joined Indian folk dance teams. She studied psychology and biomedical sciences at George Washington University and graduated with a Bachelor of Science degree in biological sciences. She moved to India for two years to learn music.

She collaborated on music with her sister, Vandana Iyer, and her boyfriend, Shankar Tucker, whom she met in college. She also participates in bhangra and hip hop dance.

Career
Vidya Iyer regularly sings in a band organized by Tucker, along with percussionist Jomy George. She has performed in various locations around the world, including the White House, National Centre for the Performing Arts (India), and Webster Hall. She has also performed at Festivals Des Artes on Réunion; for INK Women; in Suriname; in Dubai, UAE; and at the Meru Concert Series in the Netherlands.

Her most popular mashup was "Closer / Kabira", a mash up of Closer by Chainsmokers and Kabira from the Bollywood film Yeh Jawaani Hai Deewani which clocked in over 55 million views in 7 months. One of her mashups is "Lean On" and "Jind Mahi", for which she had a collaboration with several other musicians, including Ricky Jatt, Raashi Kulkarni, and Roginder "Violinder" Momi. She released "Kuttanadan Punjayile", a famous Kerala boat song, as a fusion along with an English song written by Tucker and herself, which was shot in Kerala with Mohiniyattam performed by Sreenidhi and Sreedevi. In 2016, she released her EP, Kuthu Fire, which was produced by Shankar Tucker, and co-written by Shankar Tucker and herself.

Discography

Albums
2017: Kuthu Fire
2017: Diamonds
2019: Mad Dreams
2020: Thalaivi

References

Further reading

External links
 
 

Living people
1991 births
Singers from Chennai
People from Virginia
Indian emigrants to the United States
American women pop singers
American women singers of Indian descent
American YouTubers
George Washington University alumni
American expatriates in India
Expatriate musicians in India
21st-century American singers
21st-century American women singers
American people of Malayali descent